The Norwegian Patriots (NP) was a short-lived political party in Norway led by Øyvind Heian whose sole aim was to stop non-western immigration to Norway. The party ran for election limited to the county of Vestfold in the 2009 parliamentary election, where it received a mere 184 votes. The disappointing result lead to the party being "put on ice", and on 23 September it was announced that the party was dissolved.

Activities
In June 2009 Stop Islamisation of Norway (SIAN) was joined by Heian for a rally against Islam in Oslo. The rally was ended before it had started, as the group came in a violent clash with left-wing activists. The police claimed that the left-wing activists were the active part of the clash. The newspaper Verdens Gang claimed that there was a mobile text messaging campaign involving the far-left Blitz-movement and the Red Party organising a counter-demonstration.

In August 2009 Heian was attacked during a school debate in Tønsberg by activists from SOS Rasisme. During much of the debate, items were thrown against Heian, and presumably hit by a bottle from one of the audience, he was left bleeding from his head and had to receive medical aid.

Parliamentary elections

References

Defunct political parties in Norway
Political parties established in 2007
2007 establishments in Norway
Political parties disestablished in 2009
2009 disestablishments in Norway
Far-right political parties in Norway